The 2021 All-Ireland Senior Ladies' Football Championship Final was the 48th All-Ireland Final and the deciding match of the 2021 All-Ireland Senior Ladies' Football Championship, an inter-county ladies' Gaelic football tournament for the county teams of Ireland. Dublin contested their 12th final, and were chasing 5 All-Ireland victories in a row after defeating Mayo in the 2021 semi-final.

Meath were playing in their first All-Ireland Senior final, having won the 2020 All-Ireland Intermediate Ladies' Football Championship, and defeated Cork in the semi-final. Meath won their first Senior All Ireland and ended Dublin's drive for five consecutive titles.

Match info

See also
 List of All-Ireland Senior Ladies' Football Championship finals

References

final
All-Ireland Senior Ladies' Football Championship Finals
Ladies' All-Ireland Championship